Randal A. Koene  a Dutch neuroscientist, neuroengineer, and co-founder of carboncopies.org, an outreach and road mapping organization for advancing Substrate-Independent Minds (SIM).  Between 2008 and 2010, Koene was Director of the Department of Neuroengineering at the Fatronik-Tecnalia Institute in Spain, One of the third largest private research organization in Europe. Koene earned his Ph.D. in Computational Neuroscience at the Department of Psychology at McGill University and his M.Sc. in Electrical Engineering with a specialization in Information Theory at Delft University of Technology.  A former professor at the Center for Memory and Brain of Boston University, and co-founder of the Neural Engineering Corporation of Massachusetts. Koene established the MindUploading.org website. He first proposed the term and specific approach called whole brain emulation, the purpose of which is the technological accomplishment of mind transfer to a different substrate.  His professional research objective is the implementation of whole brain emulation: creating the large-scale high-resolution representations and emulations of activity in neuronal circuitry that are needed in patient-specific neuroprostheses. He is a member of the Oxford working group that convened in 2007 to create a first roadmap toward whole brain emulation.

Koene has professional expertise in computational neuroscience, psychology, information theory, electrical engineering and physics. He organizes neural engineering efforts to obtain and replicate function and structure information that resides in the neural substrate for use in neuroprostheses and neural interfaces. Based on NETMORPH, Koene's computational framework for the simulated morphological development of neuronal circuitry, his lab is creating a Virtual Brain Laboratory to give neuroscientists, neuroengineers and clinicians large-scale high-resolution quantitative tools analogous to the computational tools that have become essential in fields such as genetics, chemistry or the aero-space industry. This effort bridges scales and will help determine how significant functions are encoded robustly in neural ensembles, and how those functions can nevertheless depend in specific ways on the detailed biophysics of particular component physiology.

References

External links
 carboncopies.org
 MindUploading.org webpage
 netmorph.org
 ASIM Expert Series 2010, Write-up and Video: "Realistic Routes to Substrate-Independent Minds"
 Singularity Summit 2009, Video: The Time is Now: As a Species and as Individuals we Need Whole Brain Emulation"
 Video: “Scope and Resolution in Neural Prosthetics and Special Concerns for Emulation of a Whole Brain”
 AGI 2010 Tutorial, Video: "Neural Mechanisms of Reinforcement Learning"
 Singularity Summit Australia talk, Video & Abstract: "Substrate Independent Minds"
 Singularity Summit Australia talk, Video & Abstract: "Extending Life is Not Enough"

McGill University Faculty of Science alumni
Delft University of Technology alumni
Living people
Dutch transhumanists
Year of birth missing (living people)